Club Polideportivo Vícar Goya Almería is a Spanish women's handball club from Vícar, Almería currently playing in second-tier División de Honor Plata.

Founded in 1980 in the Cruz de Caravaca district's Francisco de Goya school, Goya Almería played in the División de Honor between 1999 and 2011, with a 4th place (2001) as it best result. It also played the EHF Cup in 2001 and 2002. Following the end of the 2010-11 season it sold its spot in the category to BM Remudas due to financial strain.

Season to season

13 seasons in División de Honor

References

Sport in Almería
Spanish handball clubs
Handball clubs established in 1980
1980 establishments in Spain
Sports teams in Andalusia